is a Japanese actress and voice actress. She has played voice roles in a number of Japanese anime including Satsuki Kiryūin in Kill la Kill, Ino Yamanaka in Naruto and Boruto: Naruto Next Generations, Shamal in Magical Girl Lyrical Nanoha A's, Temari in Shugo Chara!, Risa Momioka in To Love-Ru, Akio Fudou in Trinity Seven, Minagi Tohno in Air, Shizuka Hiratsuka in My Youth Romantic Comedy Is Wrong, As I Expected, Tomoe Mikagura in Tailenders, and Uruoi-chan in Pururun! Shizuku-chan.

More recently, she has played the roles of Sayu's mother in Higehiro, Hilda Boreas Greyrat in Mushoku Tensei, Courage in Food Wars!: Shokugeki no Soma, and Metera in Granblue Fantasy Versus.

Filmography

Television animation

Theatrical animation

Drama CDs

Video games

Live action roles
All Night Long – Girl at Railroad Crossing
All Night Long 2 – Sayaka Mizukami
All Night Long 3 – Hitomi Nomura
Angel of Darkness 3 – Fumie Saotome
Banana Hakusho 2 – Kaoru
Black Jack 2: Pinoko Aishiteru – Yurie Saionji, The Masked Woman
Eko Eko Azarak: Wizard of Darkness – Kazumi Tanaka
The Gigolo Dochinpira – Yuna Katsuki
Gold Rush – Ayumi Nagashii
Happy End Story – Yūko Itō
Hana no Ran – Attendant
Kasaeifu wa Mita 14 – Kanae Aoyagi
Labyrinth: The Invisible Man – Keiko Mukai
Ladies in Torture I – Chika
Otona no Ehon – Kadori Kadomatsu
Sakura no Sono – Shiomi Kanagawa
Teito Monogatari Gaiden
Tokyo Babylon 1999 – Rie
Yabō Dake ga Ai o Korosu: Game no Kisoku – Satomi Tachibana
Voyeurs, Inc. – Sanae Ishihara

Dubbing

Movie 
The Exorcist: Director's Cut – Regan McNeill (Linda Blair)
Legally Blondes – Tiffany Donohugh (Brittany Curran)
Thirteen – Tracy Louise Freeland (Evan Rachel Wood)

Animation 
 Transformers series (1997–2013)
 Beast Wars: Transformers (1997–1998, Blackwidow, NAVI-ko, Una) * Debut work under the name of Ayumi Nagashii
 Transformers: Animated (2010, Blackarachnia, Narration in Otoboto family segments)
 Transformers: Prime (2012–2013, Airachnid, Ida)
 Barbie (film series) (2001–2018)
 Barbie in the Nutcracker (2001, Clara)
 Barbie as Rapunzel (2002, Rapunzel)
 Barbie of Swan Lake (2003, Odette)
 Barbie as the Princess and the Pauper (2004, Princess Annalize / Erica)
 Barbie Dolphin Magic (2018, Barbie)
 My Little Pony: Friendship Is Magic (2015–2017, Trixie)
 My Little Pony: Equestria Girls (film) (2015)
 My Little Pony Girls: Rainbow Adventure (2015)
 My Little Pony: Equestria Girls – Legend of Everfree (2017)
 High Guardian Spice (2021, Amaryllis)

References

External links
  
 Ryōka Yuzuki at GamePlaza-Haruka Voice Acting Database 
 Ryōka Yuzuki at Hitoshi Doi's Seiyuu Database
 
 

1974 births
Living people
People from Anjō
Voice actresses from Aichi Prefecture
81 Produce voice actors
Japanese video game actresses
Japanese voice actresses
Japanese gravure models
Japanese female adult models